José Ibáñez may refer to:

Sportsmen
José María Ibáñez, Argentinian racing driver in 1955 World Sportscar Championship season#Race results
José Ibáñez Gómez (born 1951), Cuban Olympic medalist in judo
José Ibáñez (cyclist) (born 1968), Colombian racing cyclist
José Ibañez, French racing driver in 2009 Formula Le Mans Cup season#Drivers' standings position 36
Jose Ibañez, Chilean Equestrian at the 2011 Pan American Games – Team eventing#Dressage

Others
José Ibáñez Noriega, 1875–1981), Cuban musician known as Chicho Ibáñez
José Ibáñez Martín (1896–1969), Spanish government official
José Ángel Ibáñez (1950–2011), Mexican educator and politician
José Ibáñez, Argentinian film producer of 2008 documentary Maradona by Kusturica
José María Ibáñez Zafón, Spanish local official, alcalde of Zucaina since 2011

See also 
Joseph Ibáñez (1927–2009), French footballer and coach (2009 in association football#Deaths on 20 June)
San José, Andrés Ibáñez, town in Bolivia